Yiddisher Arbeter Sport Klub (Yiddish for 'Jewish Workers Sports Club', abbreviated YASK; , abbreviated JASK) was a Jewish sports organization in Antwerp, Belgium. It was founded in 1936. YASK was linked to the Communist Party of Belgium. A product of the Popular Front era, YASK was set up as an open sports organization for the Jewish population at large. The club emphasized anti-fascism, whilst maintaining a neutral stand on Zionism.

YASK sent a troupe to the 1937 People's Olympics in Barcelona. YASK members were active in the United Jewish Help Committee for Spain in Antwerp.

YASK served as a pool for recruitment for resistance cells during the Second World War.

References

Jewish communist movements
Jewish sports organizations
Communist sports organizations
Sports organisations of Belgium
Organisations based in Antwerp Province
Sport in Antwerp
Sports organizations established in 1936
1936 establishments in Belgium
Secular Jewish culture in Europe